Dancing Down the Stony Road is the seventeenth studio album by British singer-songwriter Chris Rea, released in 2002 on his own record label, Jazzee Blue. The album has also been released in Europe by Edel under the shorter title Stony Road with different cover art and only one CD (except Germany), while the original UK is double CD edition with additional tracks. The album is notable for its change of Rea's previous rock music style to Delta blues and gospel blues. It reached #14 position in UK album charts, and was certified Gold by BPI. A version of Dancing Down The Stony Road was used in the BBC television programme Speed.

Summary
In 2000 Rea was diagnosed with pancreatic cancer and in 2001 undergone a risky but life-saving surgical operation (Whipple procedure), which made him be in ill and weak condition. During his several months long stay in hospital he experienced an epiphany as someone brought him Miles Davis Kind of Blue which he regularly listened to, inspired him to get a book on modulation, and even later in his life he plays it in the background while painting, which he started during recuperation. It was a hard time for him because accustomed to writing a song every day he could not do it in such condition, and recalls that when found an old Sister Rosetta Tharpe album in his home he burst into tears. Rea recalls that he was not afraid of dying although "it did look like the end, but what got me through was the thought of leaving a record that my two teenage daughters could say, "That's what Papa did - not the pop stuff, but the blues music. That's what he was about". And it is. Stony Road is the one you can pin on my headstone.

In an interview, Rea revealed that "it's not until you become seriously ill and you nearly die and you're at home for six months, that you suddenly stop, to realise that this isn't the way I intended it to be in the beginning. Everything that you've done falls away and start wondering why you went through all that rock business stuff". Although the record company offered him millions to do a duets album with music stars, having promised himself that if he recovered he would be returning to his blues roots, he decided to set up his own independent Jazzee Blue record label to free himself from the pressure of record company expectations. The album was refused to be released by Rea's previous record company, East West Records. He recalls that "If the heads of all the music companies had known about music and about Chris Rea fans, they wouldn't have worried about Stony Road. My regular fans have always known that side of me... I knew they wouldn't have a problem with it. So I made Stony Road anyway. All the record companies rejected it. I was very pleased when it eventually went gold".

Most of the album is inspired by Delta blues, and Rea explains that "it's less aggressive than Chicago blues, and the guitar playing has a style I call curling: there are some notes that are not a sharp or a flat, but a bend of emotion. It's a mournful sound, and Delta people sing about deep pain, deep fear, and trying to save one's soul. Chicago players sing about girls and booze. Delta bluesmen were singing to the sky; Chicago bluesmen developed their stage act by singing to people who were drinking. It's a big difference". Particularly inspired by his original influence to take slide guitar, Charley Patton, others are Son House, Lead Belly, Blind Lemon Jefferson, Blind Willie Johnson and Robert Johnson.

Release
The album was released in 2002 by Rea's independent record label, Jazzee Blue. It was released in a regular double CD edition, and deluxe edition (issued in three-fold Digipak), both with CD 1 enhanced with selected scenes from the accompanying DVD documentary, as well with 24 page lyric booklet. The album has also been released in Europe by Edel under the shorter title Stony Road with different cover art and only one CD, except in Germany where also was released in a limited edition with double CD and enhanced CD 1 with videos "Making Of Stony Road (Shortcut)" and "Dancing Down The Stony Road (Live From The Montreux Jazz Festival)".

By Edel Records was released a double DVD Stony Road, including on DVD 1 a 75 minute documentary of the making of the album as well 20 minute concert footage from Cologne and interviews, plus his gallery of paintings, while on DVD 2 a 23 minute concert footage from Chris Rea performance from the Montreux Jazz Festival in 2002.

Reception
The original album in The Sunday Times review was described as "raw, honest music - a powerful blues album, and the best record Rea has ever made", in Q "that's a testament to the pull of the Delta Blues". In the Uncut review was given 3/5 stars, concluding "it's pleasing, JJ Cale kind of fare, but it should never have been a double CD. Even labours of love need editing". Helmut Moritz in a review of Stony Road one CD edition for laut.de gave 4/5 stars and that "ingenious songwriter finds incessantly the concise chords that provide the stage for his gloomy life experiences [...] has created a unique collection". Jörn Schlüter for German edition of Rolling Stone gave it 3/5 stars.

Track listing
All songs written and composed by Chris Rea.

Dancing Down the Stony Road (2-CD Jazzee Blue edition)

CD1:
 "Easy Rider" – 4:50
 "Stony Road" – 5:32
 "Dancing the Blues Away" – 4:39
 "Catfish Girl" – 3:13
 "Burning Feet" – 5:01
 "Slow Dance" – 4:11
 "Segway" – 2:23
 "Mississippi 2" – 4:41
 "So Lonely" – 3:17
 "Heading for the City" – 6:09
CD2:
 "Ride On" – 4:18
 "When the Good Lord Talked to Jesus" – 4:16
 "Qualified" – 4:55
 "Sun Is Rising" – 6:48
 "Someday My Peace Will Come" – 3:49
 "Got to Be Moving On" – 3:47
 "Ain't Going Down This Way" – 3:14
 "Changing Times" – 3:05
 "The Hustler" – 4:12
 "Give That Girl a Diamond" – 3:54

''Stony Road (1-CD Edel Edition) "Changing Times" – 3:05
 "Easy Rider" – 4:50
 "Stony Road" – 5:30
 "Dancing the Blues Away" – 4:38
 "Burning Feet" – 5:01
 "Mississippi 2" – 4:41
 "Slow Dance" – 4:11
 "When the Good Lord Talked to Jesus" – 4:16
 "Heading for the City" – 6:08
 "So Lonely" – 3:19
 "Someday My Peace Will Come" – 3:51
 "The Hustler" – 4:14
 "Diamond" / "Give That Girl a Diamond" – 3:54Stony Road'' (2-CD Edel Edition)

CD1:
 "Changing Times" – 3:05 	
 "Easy Rider" – 4:50 	
 "Stony Road" – 5:32 	
 "Dancing the Blues Away" - 4:39 	
 "Burning Feet" – 5:01 	
 "Mississippi 2" – 4:41 	
 "Slow Dance" – 4:11 	
 "When the Good Lord Talked to Jesus" – 4:16 	
 "Heading for the City" – 6:09 	
 "So Lonely" – 3:17 	
 "Someday My Peace Will Come" – 3:49 	
 "The Hustler" – 4:12 	
 "Give That Girl a Diamond" – 3:54 
CD2:
 "Sun Is Rising" – 6:48 	
 "Got to Be Moving On" – 3:47 	
 "Ain't Going Down This Way" – 3:14 	
 "Catfish Girl" – 3:13 	
 "Ride On" – 4:18 	
 "Segway" – 2:23 	
 "Qualified" – 4:55

Personnel 

Album
 Chris Rea – vocals, acoustic piano, organ, guitars, producer, paintings
 Ed Hession – accordion
 Robert Ahwai – guitars
 Gerry O'Connor – banjo
 Sylvin Marc – bass
 Martin Ditcham – drums
 Stewart Eales – engineer
 John Kelly – mastering
 Peacock – design
 Olaf Heine – photography

Video
 Chris Rea – producer 
 Andy Wilman – producer
 John Knowles – executive producer
 Robert Payton – director
 Chris Rodmell – film editor
 Aiden Farrell – video editor
 Douglas Dreger – sound mix
 Richard Williams – narrator
 Peacock – design
 Olaf Heine – photography
 Janina Stamps – production manager

Charts and certifications

Charts

Certifications

References

2002 albums
Blues albums by English artists
Chris Rea albums